Zachaenus parvulus (common names:  Girard's frog, Rio bug-eyed frog) is a species of frog in the family Cycloramphidae. It is endemic to southeastern Brazil and is known from the eastern São Paulo, Rio de Janeiro, and Espírito Santo states.

Its natural habitats primary and secondary forests where it lives in the leaf-litter on the forest floor. It is a common species. Habitat loss might pose some threat to it.

References

parvulus
Endemic fauna of Brazil
Amphibians of Brazil
Taxa named by Charles Frédéric Girard
Amphibians described in 1853
Taxonomy articles created by Polbot